Heinz Radzikowski (7 September 1925 – 18 April 2017) was a German field hockey player who competed in the 1956 Summer Olympics. He was born in Stolp.

References

External links
 

1925 births
2017 deaths
German male field hockey players
Olympic field hockey players of the United Team of Germany
Field hockey players at the 1956 Summer Olympics
Olympic bronze medalists for the United Team of Germany
Olympic medalists in field hockey
Sportspeople from Słupsk
People from the Province of Pomerania
Medalists at the 1956 Summer Olympics
20th-century German people